Helina duplex is a species of fly in the family Muscidae. It is found in Papua New Guinea, including the Bismark Archipelago, and Queensland, Australia. It was the only Helina species recorded in Papua New Guinea before 1984.

References

Muscidae
Insects of Australia
Diptera of Australasia
Insects of Papua New Guinea
Taxa named by Paul Stein
Insects described in 1900